Ruben Yttergård Jenssen (born 4 May 1988) is a Norwegian footballer who plays as a midfielder for Eliteserien club Tromsø, and the Norwegian national team. He was playing regularly for Tromsø in the Tippeligaen since 2008, and became one of the team's most important players before transferring to Kaiserslautern. Early in his career, Jenssen played as a winger, but he has later played as a central midfielder. Jenssen made his international debut for Norway in May 2010, and has since then been a member of the national team, and a regular starter since September 2012. He is the son of former footballer Truls Jenssen.

Early life
Born in Tromsø, Jenssen played for Fløya during his youth. His family moved to Sogn og Fjordane when his father, Truls Jenssen, was head coach of Sogndal IL during the 1997 season, and the nine-year-old played for a team in Sogndal's youth department.

Jenssen's mother, Ann-Torild, who played basketball for Tromsø Basketballklubb (now Tromsø Storm) did not want him to play football and wanted him to try out gymnastics and basketball instead. After he played basketball for a year when he was 13, he asked his mother if he could quit.

Club career

Tromsø

2006 season
After playing for Tromsø's youth team, Jenssen was promoted to the first-team squad ahead of the 2006 season. He signed a four-year contract with the club in April 2006, and Steinar Nilsen, Tromsø's director of sports, stated that Jenssen was one of the most talented footballers hailing from Tromsø ever. Tromsø's head coach Ivar Morten Normark claimed that the signing of Jenssen was better for the development of young players from Northern Norway, than if the club had signed Ronaldinho.

Jenssen had been playing as a central midfielder during his youth, but was retrained as a left wing in 2006. He made his debut for Tromsø in the first match of the 2006 Tippeligaen against Molde on 9 April 2006. Despite starting the first match of the season, Jenssen did not play regularly for the Tromsø-team that battled against relegation in 2006. He made four more appearances as a substitute in the league, and played one match in the Norwegian Cup. Following Ole Martin Årst's transfer from Standard Liège to Tromsø in 2006, the Belgium club had secured an option to sign Jenssen free of charge, and he was in 2006 offered a contract with the club's academy. Jenssen rejected this offer. He was again offered a one-year contract with Standard in June 2007, this time with the club's first team, but Jenssen also turned this offer down.

2007 season
With Steinar Nilsen as head coach in the 2007 season, Jenssen made 15 appearances in the league, all as a substitute.

2008 season
After starting a few matches for Tromsø in the 2008 season, Jenssen scored his first goal in Tippeligaen with a match-winning goal against HamKam on 20 July 2008. Jenssen scored another match-winning goal in August, this time against Aalesund, and became a regular starter for Tromsø during the season, contributing to the team's bronze medals.

2009 season
After Steinar Nilsen moved to Brann, Per-Mathias Høgmo became the head coach of Tromsø, and Jenssen was in the 2009 season Høgmo's most used player as he played all of the 30 matches in the 2009 Tippeligaen. After having played as a winger for Tromsø, he became a central midfielder this season.

2011 season
Jenssen also played most of the matches in the 2011 season, but after playing 89 matches in a row for Tromsø he missed the match against Viking in August 2011 due to a suspension after three yellow cards. Jenssen scored his first Tippeligaen-goal in three years in the 3–1 win against Fredrikstad on 21 August 2011. He scored the first goal in the match after two minutes.

2012 season
In the 2012 season, Jenssen was again playing every match until he had to skip the match against Sandnes Ulf in November 2012 due to an injury. This was the first time Jenssen was unable to play a match for Tromsø, since he became a regular in the first time in 2008. Tromsø's Miika Koppinen was placed on the bench in the 2012 Norwegian Football Cup Final, and Jenssen captained the side in the club's third Norwegian Football Cup final.

1. FC Kaiserslautern
On 4 June 2013, he signed a three-year contract with 2. Bundesliga club 1. FC Kaiserslautern.

Groningen
On 7 June 2016, he signed with Dutch Eredivisie side FC Groningen.

In January 2018, Jenssen re-joined former club 1. FC Kaiserslautern on loan for the second half of the season.

Brann
Yttergård Jenssen signed with Brann on 11 August 2018 on a 2 years contract.

Tromsø
Yttergård Jenssen signed with Tromsø on 18 January 2020 on a 4 years contract.

International career
Jenssen first represented Norway at the under-16 level, and soon became a regular on Norwegian youth teams. He played 21 matches and scored two goals from under-16 level to under-19 level, and became the captain of the under-21 team in 2009. He played a total of 13 matches for the under-21 team.

In May 2010, Jenssen was selected for the Norwegian national team for the first time along with Jonathan Parr, as a replacement for Bjørn-Helge Riise and John Arne Riise who attended Bjørn-Helge's wedding. Jenssen made his debut for Norway when he started the match against Montenegro and played for 57 minutes. Parr and Jenssen were originally returning to the under-21 for a match against Finland U21 after the Montenegro-match, but they both returned to their clubs with injuries. Jenssen has since then been a regular in Egil Olsen's national team, and he has been a regular starter since he started the World Cup qualifier against Slovenia on 11 September 2012. Jenssen was awarded the Gold Watch after his 25th cap against Macedonia on 11 June 2013, and became the eighth footballer from Northern Norway to reach that milestone.

Personal life
Jenssen comes from a family of footballers; his father Truls, is a former Tromsø player and he has also coached Sogndal, Tromsdalen and Tromsø. His brother Markus won the Norwegian Youth Cup with Tromsø, and the youngest brother Ulrik has been a regular on Norwegian national youth teams and moved to Lyon in 2013.

Jenssen married his girlfriend of eight years, Maria Evertsen Berg, in December 2012. His best man was Christer Johnsgård, a former Tromsdalen-player who now works in Norwegian Broadcasting Corporation.

Style of play
Being a central midfielder his biggest talent is his passing ability. His vision and orientation of the game combine with an outstanding left-foot to make him a powerful player.

Career statistics

Club

Notes

International

References

External links

1988 births
Living people
Sportspeople from Tromsø
Norwegian footballers
Norway youth international footballers
Norway under-21 international footballers
Norway international footballers
Sogndal Fotball players
Tromsø IL players
1. FC Kaiserslautern players
FC Groningen players
SK Brann players
Eliteserien players
2. Bundesliga players
Eredivisie players
Norwegian expatriate footballers
Expatriate footballers in Germany
Expatriate footballers in the Netherlands
Norwegian expatriate sportspeople in Germany
Association football midfielders